Vrhovec is a surname. Notable people with the surname include:

Blaž Vrhovec (born 1992), Slovenian footballer
Janez Vrhovec (1921–1997), Serbian actor
Josip Vrhovec (1926–2006), Croatian partisan and communist politician

Croatian surnames
Slovene-language surnames